Anthony Richardson may refer to:

Anthony Richardson (American football), American football player
Anthony Richardson (writer) (1899–1964), British author
Anthony Richardson (basketball) (born 1983), American basketball player
Anthony Richardson (boxer) (born 1947), Dutch boxer

See also
Antonio Richardson (born 1992), American football offensive lineman
Tony Richardson (disambiguation)